Samsung Galaxy Trend 2 Lite is a low-end smartphone released by Samsung Electronics in July 2015. Like all other Samsung Galaxy smartphones, it runs on the Android mobile operating system. It was released around the same time when Samsung consolidated entire Galaxy range with A and later J series models.

Specifications

Hardware 
Samsung Galaxy Trend 2 Lite is powered by Spreadtrum SC8830 system-on chip with a 32-bit 1.2 GHz processor and ARM Mali-400 MP GPU. It has a 4-inch TFT LCD touchscreen. The phone has 3G+ capabilities, albeit having microSIM card slot. It has a removable battery.

Camera 
The Galaxy Trend 2 Lite has a 3.2-megapixel camera with LED flash and no front-facing camera. The rear camera has 4 shooting modes. It can record 480p video at 24 fps.

Memory and storage 
The Galaxy Trend 2 Lite features 512 MB of RAM and 4GB of internal storage. It supports removable MicroSD cards for storage expansion up to 64 GB.

Software 
The device runs on Android 4.4.4 KitKat with Samsung's TouchWiz Essence UX user interface.

References

External links 

 

Samsung smartphones
Galaxy
Galaxy
Mobile phones introduced in 2015